Semenyih is a state constituency in Selangor, Malaysia, that has been represented in the Selangor State Legislative Assembly since 1959.

The state constituency was created in the 1958 redistribution and is mandated to return a single member to the Selangor State Legislative Assembly under the first past the post voting system.

Demographics

History
It was abolished in 1995 when it was redistributed. It was re-created in 2003.

Polling districts 
According to the gazette issued on 30 March 2018, the Semenyih constituency has a total of 23 polling districts.

Representation history

Election results

References

Selangor state constituencies